Tayloria is the scientific name for genera of organisms and may refer to:
Tayloria (gastropod), a genus of land snails
Tayloria (plant), a genus of mosses